This is a list of franchise records for the Los Angeles Kings of the National Hockey League (updated through April 7, 2019).

Career regular season leaders

Skaters

Goaltenders
 Minimum 50 games

 Minimum 50 games

Single season records

Skaters

Goaltenders

Career playoff leaders

Skaters

Goaltenders
 Minimum 10 games

 Minimum 7 games

Notes
†: Beginning in the 2005–06 season, ties are no longer possible. At the same time, the League began tracking overtime losses for goaltenders.

Active Kings players are in Bold.

See also
List of Los Angeles Kings players
List of Los Angeles Kings seasons

References

External links
Hockey-Reference – Los Angeles Kings Franchise Index

Records
National Hockey League statistical records